William Couturié is a film director and producer, best known for his work in the field of documentary film.

Accolades
He won the 1989 Academy Award for the AIDS documentary Common Threads: Stories from the Quilt that he produced with Rob Epstein and multiple Emmy Awards for his 1987 film Dear America: Letters Home from Vietnam, which he wrote, produced, and directed.

Other works
Couturié was an early collaborator of filmmaker John Korty, working on his 1983 animated feature, Twice Upon a Time alongside George Lucas. He recently co-produced and directed the film Guru of Go, a documentary for the ESPN 30 for 30 series about Paul Westhead' s unorthodox fast break basketball offense at Loyola Marymount University called "The System" featuring Gregory "Bo" Kimble and the late Hank Gathers.

Filmography

Can't It Be Anyone Else (1980); producer
Porklips Now (1980): producer
Twice Upon a Time (1983); producer and writer
Vietnam Requiem (1984); director and producer
Dear America: Letters Home from Vietnam (1987); director, producer and writer
Freedom Fighter (Laserdisc arcade game) (1987); producer
Common Threads: Stories from the Quilt (1989); producer
Memorial: Letters from American Soldiers (1991); director and producer
Earth and the American Dream (FI) (1992); director, producer and writer
Loyalty & Betrayal: The Story of the American Mob (1994); executive producer
Ed (1996); director and executive producer
A Place at the Table (2001); executive producer
Mighty Times: The Legacy of Rosa Parks (2002); executive producer
The West Wing Documentary Special (2002); director and writer
Last Letters Home: Voices of American Troops from the Battlefields of Iraq (2004); director and producer
Into the Fire (2005); director and writer
Boffo! Tinseltown's Bombs and Blockbusters (2006); director, producer and writer
The Alzheimer's Project (2009); director and producer (1 episode)
Guru of Go (2010); director and producer (featured on 30 for 30)
Thumbs (2011); director

References

External links

HBO interview

Living people
Year of birth missing (living people)
American film directors
American film producers
American documentary filmmakers
Producers of Best Documentary Feature Academy Award winners
Primetime Emmy Award winners